Nikki Jenkins (born  1976) is a retired New Zealand artistic gymnast. Aged 14, she won gold at the 1990 Commonwealth Games, and she remains the youngest New Zealander to have won a gold medal at Commonwealth or Olympic Games.

Jenkins won the gold medal in the women's vault at the 1990 Commonwealth Games in Auckland, New Zealand. She had been considered an outsider at the event who was not expected to have a high placing. Consequently she became the youngest New Zealander to win a gold medal at either the Commonwealth or Olympic Games.

Following the Games, Jenkins had increased demands from the media and expectations from the public. She was invited to a prestigious event in Russia and after that she prepared for the 1991 World Championships, where she intended to gain an individual qualification for the 1992 Summer Olympics in Barcelona, Spain. She contracted measles before the 1991 event and this meant that she could not compete. Moreover all the competitors were required to be inoculated and this caused some suspicion amongst a few nations. This brought unwanted attention on New Zealand and Jenkins. Jenkins was unable to qualify for the Barcelona Olympics and continued with gymnastics, but her dream had come to an end and she eventually quit.

She opted to study physical education at the University of Otago. Sources differ whether she has been teaching physical education at schools in Auckland, or whether she lives in Australia and is involved in performing arts.

References

External links

Profile at TeAra.govt.nz

1970s births
Living people
New Zealand female artistic gymnasts
Commonwealth Games gold medallists for New Zealand
Gymnasts at the 1990 Commonwealth Games
University of Otago alumni
Commonwealth Games medallists in gymnastics
People educated at Westlake Girls High School
20th-century New Zealand women
Medallists at the 1990 Commonwealth Games